William Silva Gomes Barbio (born 22 October 1992), also known as William Barbio, is a Brazilian professional footballer. Mainly used as a right winger, he can also play as an attacking midfielder or a centre-forward.

Career statistics
(Correct )

References

External links

1992 births
Living people
Sportspeople from Rio de Janeiro (state)
Brazilian footballers
Brazilian expatriate footballers
Association football forwards
Campeonato Brasileiro Série A players
Campeonato Brasileiro Série B players
K League 2 players
Nova Iguaçu Futebol Clube players
CR Vasco da Gama players
Atlético Clube Goianiense players
Esporte Clube Bahia players
Associação Chapecoense de Futebol players
América Futebol Clube (MG) players
Joinville Esporte Clube players
Santa Cruz Futebol Clube players
Associação Desportiva Confiança players
Bucheon FC 1995 players
Seoul E-Land FC players
Ypiranga Futebol Clube players
Brazilian expatriate sportspeople in South Korea
Expatriate footballers in South Korea
People from Bedford Roxo